"Shōjo Hikō" (少女飛行) is the 1st major single by the Japanese idol group PASSPO☆, released on May 4, 2011 on the Universal J label.

Background 
PASSPO☆'s first single on a major label (Universal J) used as their major debut after their indie phase. 
The song marks the biggest drop of any single, on the Oricon chart, in history. It dropped from 1st place in its first week to 102nd in its 2nd week.

CD single

Track listing

First Press Bonuses

Limited K 
 Handshake event ticket

All Limited Versions 
 Random member photo

Charts

References 

https://web.archive.org/web/20111102060602/http://passpo.jp/discography/
https://web.archive.org/web/20110527094346/http://www.universal-music.co.jp/universalj/artist/passpo/discography.php

2011 singles
Japanese-language songs
Passpo songs
Oricon Weekly number-one singles